The Aksai Black Pied is a distinctively black and white spotted pig breed from Kazakhstan.

The breed was developed starting in 1952 at the Kasalenki state breeding and the Aksai experimental and training farms as a meat production pig. Native pigs were crossed with Large Whites and Berkshires, later being further bred with Large White and Estonian Bacon breeds to increase meat and bacon production; sows are also commercially crossed with North Caucasian and Landrace boars.

The average weight is around 245 kg (sow) 317 kg (boar).

It was bred successfully, reaching its largest population of 11,000 in 1980, but has since declined.

References

Pig breeds originating in Kazakhstan
Animal breeds originating in the Soviet Union